The 
Steinernematidae are a family of nematodes in the order Rhabditida.

Nematodes of the genus Steinernema are obligate insect parasites that inhabit soil. Xenorhabdus bacteria occupy nematode insecticide and  synergistically kill, digest, and consume insect hosts.

Together with Heterorhabditis, Caenorhabditis, Rhabditis, Pelodera, Strongyloides, Bursilla, Cruznema, and Panagrellus, Sterinernema belongs to the order Rhabditida.

References

Rhabditida
Nematode families